The Ulster Unionist Party held the majority of Northern Ireland seats in most elections for the Westminster Parliament between 1922 and 2001. Since then its representation has been low or non-existent, having been eclipsed by the Democratic Unionist Party. It always had an absolute majority in the Stormont Parliament (1921–1972); since that Parliament was replaced by the Northern Ireland Assembly it has had a substantial minority representation there. Its share of the vote in Northern Ireland local government elections has tended to diminish, so that there too it is no longer the largest party. Finally, the party has always held one of the three Northern Ireland seats in the European Parliament. Its share of the Northern Ireland vote in the most recent elections to these bodies has been between 10.5% (Westminster 2017) and 16.1% (local government, 2014).

Westminster

Stormont

Local government

European Parliament

|-

Ulster Unionist Party
Ulster Unionist Party
Ulster Unionist Party
Ulster Unionist Party